The National Beef Association is the main organization in the United Kingdom that represents the UK beef cattle industry.

History
National Beef Association was formed in the early 1990s. The association meets regularly as a board, as do their four specialist committees – TB Committee, Pedigree Committee, Policy Committee, and, the recently formed Animal Health Committee.  Each geographical area of the country is also represented at a regional level through the eight forums which hold regular meetings and events which are open to all members.

Structure
National Beef Association's head office is based in at Tanners House, 20 Gilesgate, Hexham, Northumberland. 

Chris Mallon is the chief executive heading up the team, representing the association in policy, and Rosie McGowan is development manager. The National Beef Association is led by a board of trustee directors, representing each of the regional councils; the North, the Midlands, the South West, Wales, Northern Ireland, and Scotland (Scottish Beef Association). The current chairman of the board is David Thomlinson. 

The organization was incorporated as a limited company (3678612) on 4 December 1998.

References

Agricultural organisations based in the United Kingdom
Beef
Food industry trade groups
Meat processing in the United Kingdom
Organisations based in Northumberland
Science and technology in Northumberland
Tynedale
Meat industry organizations